The 2015–16 Charleston Southern Buccaneers men's basketball team represented Charleston Southern University during the 2015–16 NCAA Division I men's basketball season. The Buccaneers, led by eleventh year head coach Barclay Radebaugh, played their home games at the CSU Field House and were members of the Big South Conference. They finished the season 9–21, 5–13 in Big South play to finish in a four way tie for eighth place. They lost in the first round of the Big South tournament to Longwood.

Roster

Schedule

|-
!colspan=9 style="background:#002649; color:#C5B35B;"| Regular season

|-
!colspan=9 style="background:#002649; color:#C5B35B;"| Big South tournament

References

Charleston Southern Buccaneers men's basketball seasons
Charleston Southern
2015 in sports in South Carolina
2016 in sports in South Carolina